Bad Loipersdorf (until 2019, Loipersdorf bei Fürstenfeld) is a municipality in the district of Hartberg-Fürstenfeld in Styria, Austria.

Spa 
The Thermae Loipersdorf Spa  is well known for its size (About 36.000 m²).

Population in town as of 2015

External links

Spa towns in Austria
Cities and towns in Hartberg-Fürstenfeld District